Gradski stadion in Prijedor is a multi-purpose stadium in Prijedor, Bosnia and Herzegovina. It is currently used mostly for football matches and is the home ground of FK Rudar. The stadium can seat 3,540.

External links
Stadium information

Football venues in Bosnia and Herzegovina
Multi-purpose stadiums in Bosnia and Herzegovina
Buildings and structures in Republika Srpska